United States v. Cotton, 535 U.S. 625 (2002) is a United States Supreme Court case that held the omission of a fact in a federal indictment that would enhance the maximum sentence is not a jurisdictional error and thus is not justification for a vacation of the sentence.

Background 
Leonard Cotton was a drug dealer from Baltimore, Maryland who was charged by a federal grand jury with conspiracy to possess and conspiracy to possess with intent to distribute crack cocaine.

Under federal sentencing guidelines, the maximum sentence for a conviction without a specified quantity is twenty years imprisonment. The Court of Appeals vacated the sentence on the grounds of a jurisdictional error by the amounts not being included in the grand jury indictments.

The United States was represented by Deputy Solicitor General Michael Dreeben.

Decision 
The court ruled unanimously 9-0 in favour of the United States. The opinion read as follows:

This ruling in part overturned Ex parte Bain, 121 U.S 1 (1887).

References 

United States Supreme Court cases
United States Supreme Court cases of the Rehnquist Court
2002 in United States case law
Grand Jury Clause case law
United States Supreme Court decisions that overrule a prior Supreme Court decision